Chidi Edeh (born 18 August 1987) is a Nigerian professional footballer who plays as a striker. He played most of his career for clubs in India.

Career

Dempo
In 2007, Edeh signed with I-League side Dempo SC and appeared in 15 league matches. He scored 8 goals for the Goan side as Dempo clinched their maiden I-League title. With Dempo, he also played in the AFC Cup in 2008.

Mohun Bagan
In 2009–10, he was a prolific scorer for the Kolkata-based side. He became the darling of the club's fans when he scored a hat-trick (4 goals) in the I-League match to beat East Bengal 5–3.

East Bengal
In the 2012–13 I-League, he was a prolific scorer for the Kolkata-based side. In the 2013 AFC Cup, he played a major role in East Bengal's unbeaten run in Group-H. On 30 April, he scored from the spot against Sài Gòn Xuân Thành F.C. on the 8th minute, after he was brought down in the box.

In the pre-quarter final of the 2013 AFC Cup, he netted a hat-trick in the 5-1 win over Yangon United F.C., and also assisted Penn Orji to score on the 2nd minute. On 5 April 2014, Edeh became the fifth player to score 100 goals in the I-league when he scored the third goal for East Bengal against Mohammedan.

Kedah FA
In January 2015 he signed a contract with Kedah FA. He scored 14 goals and five assists in 16 appearances for Kedah FA in all competitions. He scored a hat trick against Johor Darul Ta'zim II F.C. at Stadium Darul Aman in a Malaysia Premier League match. He scored two goals for Kedah FA against LionsXII in Malaysia Cup 2015 competition.

Aizawl FC
On 7 June 2018, former I-League champions Aizawl FC announced the signing of Edeh, as they continued bolstering their squad for the next season. "Join us in welcoming The Nigerian Goal Machine - Chidi Edeh," the Aizawl-based club revealed the news through their Twitter handle.

Honours
Individual
2012 Indian Federation Cup Golden Boot

References

External links
 

Nigerian footballers
Association football forwards
1987 births
Living people
Expatriate footballers in India
Nigerian expatriate sportspeople in India
I-League players
Mohun Bagan AC players
Salgaocar FC players
East Bengal Club players
Dempo SC players
Sporting Clube de Goa players
Calcutta Football League players